Three submarines of the United States Navy have borne the name USS Skate, named for a type of ray.

The first USS Skate (SS-23) was a  that sank in March 1915 off Pearl Harbor.
The second  was a  that saw action in World War II.
The third , the lead ship of her class of nuclear attack submarines, saw action during the Cold War.

United States Navy ship names